= Dani Theunissen =

Dutch footballer

Personal information
- Date of birth: 20 December 1999 (age 26)
- Place of birth: Arnhem, Netherlands
- Height: 1.80 m (5 ft 11 in)
- Position: Forward

Youth career
- –2013: ESA Rijkerswoerd
- 2013–2017: NEC/FC Oss

Senior career*
Years	Team	Apps	(Gls)
2017–2020	NEC	1	(0)
2018–2020	Jong NEC	12	(2)
2020–2021	Helmond Sport	2	(0)
- * Club domestic league appearances and goals as of 12 October 2020

Dani Theunissen (born 20 December 1999) is a Dutch footballer who plays as a forward.

== Club career ==
He made his Eerste Divisie debut for NEC on 1 September 2017 in a game against FC Eindhoven.
